Fehmi Alpay Özalan (born 29 May 1973) is a Turkish former professional footballer, football manager and politician. He last worked as the manager of Samsunspor. He played 90 international games for Turkey between 1995 and 2005, making him Turkey's seventh-most capped player of all time. This included performances at two European Championships and the 2002 World Cup, in which he was selected for the Team of the Tournament. Since 2018, he is a member of the Grand National Assembly of Turkey for the Justice and Development Party (AKP).

Club career

Early career
His senior career started at Soma Linyitspor at TFF Third League. His performances caught the eyes of the biggest teams in Turkey.

In 1993, Özalan signed for one of the major Turkish clubs Beşiktaş. Özalan set a record in the Süper Lig, earning three red cards in the space of six months. He played 148 matches for Beşiktaş, netting nine times. After six years at the club, a new deal could not be negotiated. His contract was initially bought by Siirt Jetpaspor, and he was then loaned to Fenerbahçe. In his sole season at Fenerbahçe, he played 26 matches, and found the net three times.

Aston Villa
After superlative performances for his country at Euro 2000, Özalan signed for English club Aston Villa. He enjoyed a good first season with Villa and he became a fan favourite. His abilities caught the interest of Arsenal and Newcastle United. His partnership with Olof Mellberg as central-defensive partners was cut short as Özalan injured his ankle which sidelined him for the remainder of the season. He recovered just in time for the 2002 World Cup, in which he formed the core of an obstinate Turkish defensive unit. They finished third and he was elected into the team of the tournament.

The biggest clubs in Europe took note of his performances in the Far East, including the likes of FC Barcelona and Internazionale. Aston Villa manager Graham Taylor refused to sell him, which was the beginning of Özalan's downfall at Villa Park. Media reports and comments made by Taylor led to Özalan becoming a very unpopular figure at the club, missing much of the 2002–03 season. Their goalkeeper, Peter Schmeichel, defended Özalan in his article in the English newspaper, The Times.

Özalan returned to the Aston Villa team for the beginning of the 2003–04 season. In his first home game against Charlton Athletic, he was booed when walking on to the pitch by his own fans. However Özalan went on to score the first goal of that game. In consequence to his earlier booing, Özalan's goal celebration served to mock the Aston Villa fans by placing his finger on his mouth. He was again dropped due to their angry reaction. The Turkish defender was then made public enemy number one in England in late 2003 after a run-in with David Beckham during the Euro 2004 qualifier in Istanbul. He first confronted the England skipper after his first-half penalty miss, glowering over him and rubbing heads with him in full view of the referee. He followed that up by prodding a finger into Beckham's face as the players came off the pitch at half-time, sparking a tunnel brawl. Due to the angry reactions in England, his contract was terminated by Aston Villa on 23 October. Club chairman Doug Ellis declared:

Incheon United
Werder Bremen, Hamburger SV, Borussia Mönchengladbach, Hertha Berlin, and Bologna wanted to sign Özalan. However, the European transfer window was closed and he did not want to wait to play football again. He opted for a move to South Korean K-League side Incheon United's first foray into professional football in 2004. He became a South Korean citizen while he was playing there.

Urawa Red Diamonds
Özalan spent less than six months with the team before moving to the J1 League with Urawa Red Diamonds. In his first season with the club, he was honoured with the best defender of the year award. The following season with the club proved to be a catastrophe. Alpay received three red cards in seven matches. The Japanese club annulled his contract due to these disciplinary problems.

1. FC Köln
In 2005, Özalan signed a one-year-contract with the Bundesliga team 1. FC Köln. This transfer ensured his place back into the national team. They were relegated, and Manchester City, Portsmouth, Celtic, Galatasaray and Beşiktaş were interested in signing him. Özalan stayed with the club, stating that his decision was influenced by his family's happiness in Germany.

International career
Özalan made 87 appearances for the Turkey national team, netting four times. Three of those goals were a hat-trick against Macedonia during the 2002 FIFA World Cup qualifier. He was one of the best players for his country in the 2002 FIFA World Cup, where the team reached an unprecedented third place in the tournament. Özalan also featured for Turkey in Euro 1996, Euro 2000 and the 2003 FIFA Confederations Cup. A very memorable moment in Özalan's career in complete contrast to his general fame was during Euro 1996 in the game between Croatia and Turkey. In a counterattack, he allowed Croatian Goran Vlaović to dribble the ball half the field without fouling him to stop the attack. In consequence, Vlaović scored the single goal of the game and Turkey lost. Özalan was awarded with a fair-play award due to his action. On 24 June 2000, he was sent off during the first half of the Euro 2000 quarter-final against Portugal, which his country lost by a score of 2–0. His final match was against Switzerland in the 2006 FIFA World Cup second leg play-off tie in Istanbul, conceding a second-minute penalty by handball, converted by Alexander Frei which resulted in Turkey's elimination despite a 4–2 victory. Özalan was involved in a brawl at the end of the game and was awarded a six-match ban by FIFA.

Politician 
In the Parliamentary elections of 24 June 2018, he was elected a member of the Grand National Assembly of Turkey representing Izmir for the AKP. According to his own statement he was more excited the first day in parliament than when playing football before 85'000 people. In 2021, he was involved in a brawl in the Turkish parliament where he was seen fighting against  Özgür Özel, a politician of the Republican People's Party (CHP).

During the Claw lock military operation against the Kurdistan Workers Party (PKK), he demanded the cancellation of a concert of Aynur Dogan in Istanbul, because he deems her a supporter of the PKK.

Career statistics

Club

International

International goals
Scores and results list Turkey's goal tally first, score column indicates score after each Özalan goal.

Honours
Beşiktaş
 Süper Lig: 1994–95
 Turkish Cup: 1994, 1998
 Turkish Super Cup: 1998

Aston Villa
 UEFA Intertoto Cup: 2001

Urawa Red Diamonds
 Emperor's Cup: 2005

Turkey
 FIFA World Cup: Third Place: 2002
 FIFA Confederations Cup: Third Place: 2003

Individual
 FIFA World Cup All Star Team: 2002
 J1 League Defender of the Year: 2004

Footnotes

A. In 2001 Aston Villa were one of three co-winners of the Intertoto Cup with Paris Saint-Germain and Troyes AC. The club also won all of their 2008 Intertoto Cup rounds to be named joint-winners and progress to the UEFA Cup, the format was changed in 2006 to award the Intertoto Trophy to the side progressing furthest in the UEFA Cup, which was S.C. Braga.

References

External links
  (as coach)
 Alpay Ozalan short-video
 
 
 
 
 
 

1973 births
Living people
Turkish politicians
Justice and Development Party (Turkey) politicians
Association football defenders
Turkish footballers
Footballers from İzmir
Turkey under-21 international footballers
Turkey international footballers
Altay S.K. footballers
Beşiktaş J.K. footballers
Fenerbahçe S.K. footballers
Aston Villa F.C. players
Incheon United FC players
Urawa Red Diamonds players
1. FC Köln players
Süper Lig players
Premier League players
K League 1 players
J1 League players
Bundesliga players
2. Bundesliga players
2002 FIFA World Cup players
2003 FIFA Confederations Cup players
UEFA Euro 1996 players
UEFA Euro 2000 players
Mediterranean Games gold medalists for Turkey
Mediterranean Games medalists in football
Competitors at the 1993 Mediterranean Games
Turkish expatriate footballers
Expatriate footballers in England
Expatriate footballers in South Korea
Expatriate footballers in Japan
Expatriate footballers in Germany
Turkish expatriate sportspeople in England
Turkish expatriate sportspeople in South Korea
Turkish expatriate sportspeople in Japan
Turkish expatriate sportspeople in Germany